The Committee for the Peaceful Reunification of Korea (CPRK) is a North Korean state agency aimed at promoting Korean reunification.

Overview
The CPRK was not a governmental body per se but rather an offshoot of the Korean Workers' Party's United Front Department; the distinction is intended to emphasise the North Korean government's position that the Southern government is illegitimate and should not be dealt with by official bodies. It was established on 13 May 1961 as part of Pyongyang's ongoing response to the South Korean April Revolution of the preceding year which had resulted in Rhee Syng-man's resignation. The mere announcement of the CPRF's creation is believed to have exacerbated political instability in the South and to have contributed to the success of army general Park Chung-hee's coup three days later. In the aftermath of the Committee's creation, Pyongyang's reunification policy took a turn towards more pro-active means aimed at provoking the Southern government and inciting an internal Communist revolution there; Pyongyang concluded further military agreements with China and the Soviet Union, captured the USS Pueblo, attempted to assassinate Park Chung-hee in 1968 in what became known as the Blue House Raid, and shot down an American aircraft the following year. The CPRF conducts propaganda operations in South Korea and elsewhere abroad. During the fourth session of the 13th Supreme People's Assembly (SPA) on June 29, 2016, the committee was reorganized and elevated into a state agency.

Membership

Former chairmen
Kim Il (1980s)

Former vice-chairmen
Choe Deok-sin (until 1989)
Kim Yong-sun (until 2003)
Kim Ki-nam (c. 2005)

See also
Ministry of Unification, a department of South Korean government similar to CPRK
North Korea–South Korea relations

References

Further reading
 

1961 establishments in North Korea
Korean nationalist organizations
Political organizations based in North Korea
Organizations established in 1961
North Korea–South Korea relations
North Korean entities subject to the U.S. Department of the Treasury sanctions